Carlos Javier Solís Alvarado (born 22 October 1981 in Lima) is a Peruvian footballer who plays as a centre back.

He is also a great penalty kicker, and has amazing heading skills, scoring several great goals in every team he has played in. He is well known for his constant barbaric roars in the field, used to scare his rivals and gain more strength before making a header.

Club career
Solís made his Peruvian First Division debut in the 2000 Descentralizado season with Unión Minas. In 2002 Solis played for Colegio Nacional de Iquitos in the 2002 Copa Perú season. Then in the 2003 season he played for Juan Aurich in the 2003 Copa Perú.

International career
He played for the Peru national football team during the 2010 FIFA World Cup qualifying rounds.

References

External links

1981 births
Living people
Footballers from Lima
Association football central defenders
Peruvian footballers
Peru international footballers
Unión Minas footballers
Colegio Nacional Iquitos footballers
Juan Aurich footballers
Club Alianza Lima footballers
Estudiantes de Medicina footballers
Cienciano footballers
FBC Melgar footballers
Club Deportivo Universidad César Vallejo footballers
León de Huánuco footballers
Sport Huancayo footballers
José Gálvez FBC footballers
Copa Perú players
Peruvian Primera División players